Antoine Bouchard may refer to
 Antoine Bouchard (musician)
 Antoine Bouchard (judoka)